The Thalassa Hellas class is a series of 10 container ships built for Enesel and operated by Evergreen Marine. The ships have a maximum theoretical capacity of 13,808 TEU. The ships were built by Hyundai Heavy Industries in South Korea.

List of ships

See also 
 Evergreen G-class container ship
 Triton-class container ship

References 

Container ship classes
Ships built by Hyundai Heavy Industries Group